Oxford is a proposed Amtrak station in Oxford, Ohio that will be served by the Cardinal. The stop was first proposed in 2009, but an Amtrak study for such a stop determined that ridership would not be high enough to justify a stop in Oxford. However, in 2014, it was noted that nearby Miami University had a student population of around 16,000, prompting Amtrak to look again at adding an Oxford stop. In the winter of 2016–2017, it was announced that $700,000 funding for the station has been provided by the City of Oxford and Miami University, each contributing $350,000.

Amtrak is ready to move forward with adding the stop once it is constructed.  The platform will be a Category 4 platform, an unmanned kiosk.  As of March 2021, negotiations with the contractors are continuing.  The platform is to be built near the intersection of Main and Chestnut Streets in Oxford.

On November 4th, 2022, It was announced that $2 million in funding through the Ohio-Kentucky-Indiana Regional Council of Governments had been awarded for the project. The platform will be part of a new multimodal station in Oxford, and is slated to start construction in 2026.

References 

Amtrak stations in Ohio
Future Amtrak stations in the United States
Transportation buildings and structures in Butler County, Ohio